Potok Wielki is a village in Janów Lubelski County, Lublin Voivodeship, in eastern Poland. It is the seat of the gmina (administrative district) called Gmina Potok Wielki.

The village has a population of 502.

References

Potok Wielki